Pycnoptychia is a genus of a land snails, terrestrial gastropod mollusks in the family Urocoptidae.

Distribution 
This genus lives in Cuba.

Ecology 
Species in the genus Pycnoptychia are a ground dwelling species in Cuba.

Species 
Species in the genus Pycnoptychia include:
 Pycnoptychia amicorum Torre & Bartsch, 2008
 Pycnoptychia humboldtiana (Pfeiffer, 1840)
 Pycnoptychia oviedoiana (d’Orbigny, 1842)
 Pycnoptychia peraffinis (Pilsbry, 1903)
 Pycnoptychia scaeva (Gundlach in Pfeiffer, 1863)
 Pycnoptychia shuttleworthiana (Poey, 1856)
 Pycnoptychia strangulata (Poey, 1856)
 Pycnoptychia striatella (Wright in Pfeiffer, 1864)
 Pycnoptychia torrei (Arango, 1876)
 Pycnoptychia trina Torre & Bartsch, 2008

References

Urocoptidae